Désiré Alfred Mérchez (16 August 1882 – 8 July 1968) was a male French swimmer and water polo player who competed in the 1900 Summer Olympics. He was born in Lille and died in Nice.

In 1900 he won the bronze medal with the French team in the 200 metre team swimming. He also participated in the 1000 metre freestyle event but was eliminated in the first round.

As a member of the French water polo team Pupilles de Neptune de Lille #2 he won a second bronze medal at the same Olympics.

References

External links
 

1882 births
1968 deaths
Sportspeople from Lille
French male freestyle swimmers
French male water polo players
Olympic swimmers of France
Olympic water polo players of France
Swimmers at the 1900 Summer Olympics
Water polo players at the 1900 Summer Olympics
Olympic bronze medalists for France
Olympic bronze medalists in swimming
Olympic medalists in water polo
Medalists at the 1900 Summer Olympics
French male long-distance swimmers